Makhdumpur Assembly constituency is an assembly constituency for Bihar Legislative Assembly in Jehanabad district of Bihar, India. It comes under Jahanabad (Lok Sabha constituency).

Members of Legislative Assembly

Assembly Elections 2020

References

External links
 

Assembly constituencies of Bihar